The Model 1902 Army Officers' Saber is the current sword used by officers of the United States Army and United States Air Force.
The official nomenclature for the current regulation U.S. Army saber is “saber for all officers, Model 1902”. It was adopted on July 17, 1902 by authority of General Order No. 81. The M1902 saber was authorized for all officers, both infantry and cavalry, with the exception of Chaplains. The lightly curved blade measures between 30 and 34 inches long with weights initially specified by the U.S. Army to be between 20.2 and 22.8 ounces (573 to 647 grams) and a point of balance of 3.25 inches from the hilt as specified for infantry sabers.

History
By the early 1870s combat experience convinced many American military officers that swords had, at best, a tertiary role in the modern army. Given its lack of usage during the in the American Civil War and Indian Wars, many objected to the weight of carrying the Model 1850 Army Staff & Field Officers' Sword. This led to the introduction of the Model 1872 Army Staff & Field Officers' Sword, a significantly lighter design that was essentially a ceremonial weapon, to be used by officers mainly as a sign of rank and a tool to point out items to those under their command. However many disliked the idea of carrying a purely ceremonial weapon in combat, and the M1872's delicate design proved ill-suited to the rigors of military use in the field. Some officers took to carrying cavalry sabers, or not carrying any sword at all. Eventually the M1902 was developed in response to requests for a light, cut and thrust weapon that soldiers “can actually fight with”.

The final design of the M1902 was the result of many years of study and experimentation by Henry V. Allien & Company, in collaboration with several army officers after they approached Mr. Allien privately and requested he develop a more effective saber for the US military. After many years of research by Mr. Allien, including numerous trips to Europe and making a number of patterns with both straight and curved blades, a final design was completed and laid before General John C. Kelton, who was noted as being a skilled swordsman. He recommended making it less curved from center to point, the latter to be in line with the gripe, so as to give greater force in thrusting. Years later in June 1902, a board met in Washington DC to develop new regulations for Army uniforms, part of which induced the adoption of a new regulation saber. Henry V. Allien & Company submitted five pattern swords for the uniform board's consideration, three with straight blades and two with curved, and the Ordnance Department submitted a similar number. The result was that of the ten patterns, one of the Allien swords was adopted, the very one approved by General Kelton.

Although regarded as a significant improvement over the M1872, praise was not universal for the M1902. Although the uniform board contained several highly experienced and decorated officers, none were noted as experts in swordplay. The board's membership was selected to present a diverse set of military knowledge, as it also had to consider many other items of clothing and equipment, and was rather  different than it might have if the adoption of a new regulation sword was its primary concern. The resulting M1902 pattern sword was considered a compromise between lightness and efficiency, with several members of the Ordnance Board questioning if such a light blade could still be effective in combat during a 1905 review of the sword. Nonetheless, the review eventually recommended maintaining the current pattern saber and the M1902 remains the regulation sword for officers of the US army.

The M1902's modern role is completely ceremonial, and it is virtually never carried except in parades and ceremonies, by commissioned officers in command of troops in formation. It is also used by United States Air Force officers for their parades and ceremonies. As a presentation saber, the M1902 is also sometimes given to newly commissioned officers of distinction or as retirement or change of command gifts.

Notes

References

Swords of the United States
Ceremonial weapons